Fort Lauderdale station is a train station in Fort Lauderdale, Florida. It is served by Tri-Rail and Amtrak. The station is located on Southwest 21st Terrace, just south of West Broward Boulevard.

History 

The original station, which is used by Amtrak, is a former Seaboard Air Line Railway depot built in 1927. Designed in the prevalent Mediterranean Revival style by Gustav Maass of the West Palm Beach architectural firm Harvey & Clarke, it is virtually identical to the Hollywood Seaboard station to the south. The station took the place of a temporary structure that had been hastily erected at the end of 1926 to greet the January 1927 arrival of the first Seaboard passenger train in South Florida, the Orange Blossom Special.

The station was served by the Orange Blossom Special until 1953 and, among other Seaboard trains, the Silver Meteor beginning in 1939.  Amtrak maintained Silver Meteor service to the station when it took over intercity passenger train service in 1971. Both the Silver Meteor and Amtrak's Silver Star continue to use the station.

On January 9, 1989, the South Florida Regional Transportation Authority began Tri-Rail service to the station, building additional facilities and a pedestrian overpass just north of the original station. A park and ride lot is available, and is directly accessible via a proprietary exit from Interstate 95 north.

The station consists of a passenger waiting room on the northern end and a baggage room in the center section.  On the southern end is a freight room, which is used by CSX, the successor to Seaboard. Just south of the street side entry to the passenger waiting room, and representative of the racial segregation laws of the era in which the station was constructed, is the entrance to what had been the "colored" waiting room.

Station layout 

The station has two side platforms connected by an elevated passageway. The station house, parking lot, and bus stops are located west of the southbound platform.

Gallery

References

External links 

 1947 photo of Seaboard Air Line steam engine no. 242 leaving Fort Lauderdale
 South Florida Regional Transportation Authority – Fort Lauderdale Station
 May 1995 Photograph (Amtrak Photo Archive)
 Fort Lauderdale Amtrak/Tri-Rail Station (USA Rail Guide – Train Web)

Tri-Rail stations in Broward County, Florida
Amtrak stations in Florida
Seaboard Air Line Railroad stations
Railway stations in the United States opened in 1927
Economy of Fort Lauderdale, Florida
1927 establishments in Florida